The Sudbury Five are a Canadian professional basketball team based in Sudbury, Ontario that play in the National Basketball League of Canada (NBL Canada). The team is owned by Sudbury Wolves Sports and play at the Sudbury Community Arena.

History
The team was originally approved by the National Basketball League of Canada (NBL Canada) to begin play for the 2017–18 season, but was pushed back to the 2018–19 season. The organization announced their team name, Sudbury Five, and colours in May 2018. Logan Stutz was named the team's first general manager and head coach on 9 August. The team took part in the 2018 entry draft with the other nine NBL Canada teams and later received the Niagara River Lions' protected player list after that team left the league.

The team's second season was curtailed by the onset of the COVID-19 pandemic and the following 2020–21 season was cancelled by the league. In 2021, general manager and head coach Logan Stutz was hired by the Boston College Eagles as director of player development and left the Five. He was replaced by assistant coach Elliott Etherington.

Name and logo
The team's name and logo refer to the last digit in the 705 area code that serves Northern Ontario, the five-cent nickel coin, and the five players playing for each team in a basketball game.

Arena
The team play their home games at the Sudbury Community Arena. Tickets for basketball are only sold on the sides and floor of the arena, giving it a capacity 2,500 with room to expand.

Season-by-season record

Players

Current roster

References

External links
 Official website

 
National Basketball League of Canada teams
Basketball teams in Ontario
Basketball teams established in 2018
Sports teams in Greater Sudbury